"I Could Write a Book" is a show tune from the 1940 Rodgers and Hart musical Pal Joey, where it was introduced by Gene Kelly and Leila Ernst. It is considered a standard.

Critical reception
An uncredited critic reviewing "New Plays in Manhattan" for Time said of Pal Joey that the musical contains "all the dancing anyone could want and at least three more great Richard Rodgers tunes: 'I Could Write a Book' (sweet), 'Love Is My Friend' (torchy), 'Bewitched, Bothered and Bewildered' (catchy)."

Cover versions
The song has been covered by such artists as:
Anita O'Day 1960
Frank D'Rone, 
Vince Guaraldi, 
Frank Sinatra,
Vic Damone 1964 
Harry Connick Jr.,  
Dinah Washington.
Miles Davis.

In popular culture
Harry Connick Jr.'s version of "I Could Write a Book" was used in the 1989 film When Harry Met Sally..., appearing on the film's soundtrack, and also appears on the soundtrack of the 1997 film Deconstructing Harry. 
Dinah Washington's version of "I Could Write a Book", from her 1955 album For Those in Love, was used in the ninth episode of the first season of the television series Ash vs Evil Dead.

References

Sources
 

Songs about writers
Songs with music by Richard Rodgers
Songs with lyrics by Lorenz Hart
Songs from Pal Joey (musical)
Ella Fitzgerald songs
1940 songs
Songs from Pal Joey (film)
1940s jazz standards